Harry  Kent may refer to:

 Harry Kent (footballer) (1879–1948), English footballer and manager
 Harry Kent (cyclist) (1947–2021), racing cyclist from New Zealand
 Harry Kent (architect) (1852–1938), English-born Australian architect

See also
Henry Kent (disambiguation)
Harold Kent, Dean of Arches